Gösta Ingvar Carlsson (born 9 November 1934) is a Swedish politician who twice served as Prime Minister of Sweden, first from 1986 to 1991 and again from 1994 to 1996. He was leader of the Swedish Social Democratic Party from 1986 to 1996. He is best known for leading Sweden into the European Union.

Carlsson was a member of the Riksdag from 1965 to 1996 representing the constituency of Stockholm County (until 1970 in the lower house). He served as Minister of Education from 1969 to 1973, as Minister of Housing in 1973 and again from 1974 to 1976, and as Minister of Environmental affairs from 1985 to 1986. He served as Deputy Prime Minister from 1982 to 1986, and assumed office as Prime Minister of Sweden upon the assassination of Prime Minister Olof Palme in 1986.

Early life 
Carlsson was born in Borås, Västra Götaland County (then Älvsborg County), Sweden and is the third son of the warehouse worker Olof Karlsson and Ida, née Johansson. Carlsson has a diploma in business economics and a degree in political science from Lund University. In Lund he met with Tage Erlander, the Swedish prime minister, and his aide Olof Palme, later to become Erlander's successor.

Political career 
After finishing studies Carlsson got a job in Erlander's staff. In 1965, Carlsson attended Northwestern University in Illinois in the United States as a Fulbright scholar studying economics. After returning home, he was elected member of the Swedish Parliament. In the same year, he also became leader of the Swedish Social Democratic Youth League. He had the following ministerial posts: Minister of Education 1969-1973, Minister of Housing 1973-1976, Deputy Prime Minister 1982-1986.

He was, together with Olof Palme, known as one of "Erlander's boys".

Prime Minister 
Following the assassination of Olof Palme in 1986, Ingvar Carlsson became the new Prime Minister or Statsminister and party leader. Together with Minister for Finance Kjell-Olof Feldt, the government turned a budget deficit of 90 billion SEK to a surplus of a few hundred billion SEK, which initially led to large investments and record low unemployment.  1980s Social Democratic neoliberal measures—such as depressing and deregulating the currency to prop up Swedish exports during the economic restructuring transition, dropping corporate taxation and taxation on high income-earners, and switching from anti-unemployment policies to anti-inflationary policies—were exacerbated by international recession, unchecked currency speculation, and a centre-right government led by Carl Bildt (1991–1994), creating the fiscal crisis of the early 1990s.

But Sweden's economy began to deteriorate in the early 1990s. In 1990 the Carlsson cabinet resigned after failing to gain a majority for its economic policy agenda, but was reinstated immediately with a slightly changed agenda.

The Social Democrats lost the elections in 1991, but Carlsson returned to power after the elections in 1994. When the Social Democrats returned to power in 1994, they responded to the fiscal crisis by stabilizing the currency—and by reducing the welfare state and privatizing public services and goods, as governments did in many countries influenced by Milton Friedman, the Chicago Schools of political and economic thought, and the neoliberal movement.
As Prime Minister he also carried out a comprehensive reform of the tax system.

After three years in opposition and an election victory in the 1994 elections, Carlsson formed a new government. This government realigned its focus on cleaning up Swedish Government finances, and the task was assigned to the newly appointed Minister of Finance Göran Persson. The ensuing governing period was difficult and it was strongly criticized by trade unions and party members for government service cuts and tax increases that were instituted. On 19 December 1994, Carlsson announced the decision not to recover the wreck of the MS Estonia, or even the bodies of the victims of the disaster.

In August 1995, Ingvar Carlsson announced that he would resign as party leader and Swedish Prime Minister. His successor was long considered to be the then Minister of Equality and Deputy Prime Minister Mona Sahlin. However, due to the so-called Toblerone Affair, she took back her candidacy and also later resigned from the government. On 5 December 1995 the nominating committee proposed the Minister for Finance, Göran Persson, as the new party leader candidate. He was elected on 15 March 1996 at the Social Democratic Party Congress as party leader and on 22 March 1996 he was elected Prime Minister.

Later life 
Ingvar Carlsson was Chairman of the inquiry after the Gothenburg Riots of 2001 to investigate the events. Their report was submitted to the Government on 14 January 2003.

Ingvar Carlsson was the Chairman of the Independent Inquiry into United Nations actions during the 1994 Rwandan genocide. He is also chairman of the Bergman Foundation Center on Fårö.

With Shridath Ramphal, he was in 1995 one of the co-chairs of the Commission on Global Governance, which reported on issues of international development, international security, globalization and global governance.

His career has been shaped by the heritage of Olof Palme, with whom he worked closely, but his policies are more seen as being a continuation of the legacy established by Tage Erlander.

Personal life
He is married since 1957 to librarian Ingrid Melander (born 1934), daughter of the wholesaler Sven H Melander and Gerda, née Eriksson. They have two daughters.

Ingvar Carlsson is a big supporter of football teams IF Elfsborg and Wolverhampton Wanderers F.C.

Awards and decorations
   Commander of the Legion of Honour (17 February 2017)

Honours
Honorary doctor of philosophy, Lund University (1989)
Honorary degree, Northwestern University (1991)
Honorary doctor of technology, Luleå University of Technology (1996)

Bibliography

Notelist

References

Further reading

 Ruin, Olof. "Three Swedish Prime Ministers: Tage Erlander, Olof Palme and Ingvar Carlsson." West European Politics 14.3 (1991): 58-82.

|-

|-

|-

|-

|-

|-

1934 births
Living people
People from Borås
Lund University alumni
Northwestern University alumni
Leaders of the Swedish Social Democratic Party
Members of the Andra kammaren
Members of the Riksdag
Swedish Ministers for Education
Swedish Ministers for Housing
Deputy Prime Ministers of Sweden
Swedish Ministers for the Environment
Prime Ministers of Sweden
Swedish Lutherans
Recipients of the Order of the Cross of Terra Mariana, 1st Class